Hannaoceras is a genus belonging to the extinct subclass of cephalopods known as ammonites.  Specifically it belongs in the order Ceratitida.

The family to which Hannaoceras belongs, the Trachyceratidae, has more or less involute, highly ornamented shells and ceratitic to ammonitic sutures. Age range: 232.0 to 221.5 Ma.

References
Notes

Bibliography
 

Trachyceratidae
Triassic ammonites
Carnian genera
Molluscs described in 1931
Prehistoric cephalopod genera
Ceratitida genera